Kaisa Pakileata is a Tongan Athlete who has represented Tonga at the Pacific Games.

At the 2019 Pacific Games in Apia he won bronze in the pole vault.

References

Living people
Tongan pole vaulters
Year of birth missing (living people)